John Gay (born Hans Göhler: 1909 in Karlsruhe, Germany – 1999 in Highgate, London) was a photographer.

Early life
Gay attended art college in his home town.  In 1933 he left Germany, following Hitler's appointment as Chancellor, moving to England with his friend Walter Stern and Stern's family, including his mother, the photographer Martha Stern.

Career
He settled in London, where he changed his name, and launched a photographic career, finding work as a self-employed commercial photographer, before serving with the Pioneer Corps from 1939 until the end of the Second World War.

Following his marriage to Marie Arnheim in 1942, the couple settled in Highgate, London. Here he based his professional photographic practice which covered a varied range of subjects from animals for pet food companies, architecture and country scenes for Country Fair magazine, to the portraits of literary personalities including Terence Rattigan, Dylan Thomas and Vita Sackville-West for the Strand Magazine.

In the summer of 1949 Gay captured a series of photographs of Blackpool holidaymakers for Country Fair, many of which now typify the popular image of seaside holidays of the past.

Gay’s love of architecture, nature and the countryside are reflected in his work. His photographs are published in six books. It was his second book Prospect of Highgate & Hampstead (1967) that put Gay on the map as an architectural photographer. In 1972 he published London’s Historic Railway Stations with Sir John Betjeman but his best known book is Highgate Cemetery, published in 1984, with Felix Barker.  A subject close to his heart, Gay was actively involved in the rejuvenation of Highgate Cemetery following years of neglect after the Second World War.

After his death in 1999, over 40,000 of Gay's photographs were left to English Heritage and are held in its public archive, now the Historic England Archive.

There is what appears to be a headstone in the west of Highgate Cemetery suggesting that his ashes are buried there, however there is no record of their interment in the Cemetery's archives. The stone lies near a main path, opposite the grave of George Michael, but it is easily missed, being small and partly obscured by planting.

Books published

John Gay: England Observed
 published in 2009 by English Heritage.  300 photographs from the large collection of his work held by English Heritage in its public archive.

Prospect of Highgate & Hampstead
 published in 1967 and attributed to Clark, Leonard and John Gay

London’s Historic Railway Stations
 published in 1972 and attributed to Sir John Betjeman (author) and John Gay (photographer)

Highgate Cemetery: Victorian Valhalla
Gay spent a lot of time as a volunteer with the Friends of Highgate Cemetery. In 1984 they published this book incorporating a collection of his photographs, with a commentary by Francis Barker

External links
Historic England Archive

References

20th-century British photographers
Architectural photographers
Artists from Karlsruhe
1909 births
1999 deaths
Artists from London
Emigrants from Nazi Germany to the United Kingdom
Burials at Highgate Cemetery
British Army personnel of World War II
Royal Pioneer Corps soldiers